Harry Lewis, Jr. (born February 1941) is an American politician who served in the Pennsylvania House of Representatives, representing the 74th District from 2015 until his retirement in 2018.

Early life and education
Lewis was born in February of 1941 in Queens, New York City. As a child, Lewis lived in Carver Court. He graduated from Coatesville Area High School in 1959. Lewis earned a Bachelor of Science degree in health and physical education from Winston-Salem State University in 1963, a Master of Arts degree in wellness and fitness from West Chester State College in 1980, and a Master of Education from Cheyney University of Pennsylvania in 1999.

Career
Lewis worked at Coatesville Area High School for 36 years eventually becoming the school's principal.

Pennsylvania House of Representatives
Lewis was first elected in 2014 to represent the 74th District in the Pennsylvania House of Representatives. He won re-election from 2016, but declined to run again in 2018.

During his tenure, Lewis was the only African American in the Republican caucus.

References

External links
Official Web Site
PA House profile

Living people
People from Chester County, Pennsylvania
Republican Party members of the Pennsylvania House of Representatives
African-American state legislators in Pennsylvania
1941 births
21st-century American politicians
21st-century African-American politicians
20th-century African-American people
Black conservatism in the United States

Winston-Salem State University alumni
West Chester University alumni
Cheyney University of Pennsylvania alumni
Politicians from Chester County, Pennsylvania